San Lorenzo is a municipality in the Suchitepéquez department of Guatemala. It is situated at 220 m above sea level. It contains 7,753 people. It covers a terrain of 60 km². The annual festival is on February 2.

External links
Muni in Spanish

Municipalities of the Suchitepéquez Department